Monsters is the third studio album by synthwave band The Midnight. It was released on July 10, 2020, by Counter Records. The album was included on AllMusic's list of the best albums of 2020.

Background
The album deals with themes of romance, lost love and nostalgia within a backdrop of 1980s-style synthwave. In an interview with Icon vs Icon, the band confirmed that Monsters is a thematic continuation of their previous album Kids, focusing on adolescence, closeness and alienation from the perspective of a teenager. The band also confirmed that Kids and Monsters are part of a trilogy.

The cover artwork was made by artist Aaron Campbell, who also created the artwork for their previous album, Kids.

Track listing
All songs written by Tyler Lyle and Tim McEwan.
"1991 (intro)" – 0:27
"America Online" – 5:49
"Dance with Somebody" – 4:17
"Seventeen" – 4:02
"Dream Away" – 3:38
"The Search for Ecco" – 4:04
"Prom Night" – 5:02
"Fire in the Sky" – 4:09
"Monsters" (featuring Jupiter Winter) – 3:17
"Helvetica" – 5:16
"Brooklyn" – 4:14
"Deep Blue" – 3:57
"Night Skies" – 3:04
"City Dreams (interlude)" – 2:17
"Last Train" – 4:22

Charts

References

2020 albums
The Midnight albums